Ko Kyung-Doo (born 26 October 1971) is a Korean former judoka who competed in the 2000 Summer Olympics.

References

1971 births
Living people
Olympic judoka of South Korea
Judoka at the 2000 Summer Olympics
South Korean male judoka
Universiade medalists in judo
Universiade bronze medalists for South Korea